Wilfred Harold Krichefski (1916 – December 1974)  An Orthodox Jew, co- founded the island’s synagogue with Rev Wiseman in 1972. Was a Jersey senator and television executive. After his death, he was accused of sexual abuse of children at the Haut de la Garenne children's home in Jersey.

He was the first managing director of Jersey's television station, Channel TV, now known as ITV Channel Television.

Military service
He served in the Royal Army Pay Corps in World War II, being appointed a second lieutenant on 20 December 1942.

References

1916 births
1974 deaths
British Army personnel of World War II
Senators of Jersey
British television executives
Royal Army Pay Corps officers